Stewart Christopher Johnston (born February 26, 1971) is a Canadian businessman and the current president of The Sports Network and Bell Media Media Sales and Marketing.

Early life
Johnston was born in Toronto, Ontario. He moved to Ottawa soon after where he grew up. Johnston attended Ashbury College in Ottawa for his high school years and graduated from there. He described himself as a 'sports junkie' when he was young. For university, Johnston attended Queen's University in Kingston, Ontario and studied for a year at the University of British Columbia. He graduated from Queen's with an Honours Business Degree.

Career
Johnston started working as an intern at TSN in 1997. He worked his way up the ranks and was promoted to Vice President of Programming in 2006. In 2010, he was made President. In 2014, Johnston added TSN3, TSN4, TSN5 to TSN's list of networks. He described it as an "important evolution" for the network, as it would allow TSN to make more efficient use of its portfolio of sports properties, by showing more sports games on at the same time to satisfy the people and the company.

In 2019, Johnston was ranked #48 in The Hockey News' 'Top 100 People of Power and Influence.' In November, he was appointed Vice-Chairman of the Hockey Hall of Fame.

References

1971 births
Living people
Businesspeople from Ottawa
Businesspeople from Toronto